Recombinant adeno-associated virus (rAAV) based genome engineering is a genome editing platform centered on the use of recombinant rAAV vectors that enables insertion, deletion or substitution of DNA sequences into the genomes of live mammalian cells. The technique builds on Mario Capecchi and Oliver Smithies' Nobel Prize–winning discovery that homologous recombination (HR), a natural hi-fidelity DNA repair mechanism, can be harnessed to perform precise genome alterations in mice. rAAV mediated genome-editing improves the efficiency of this technique to permit genome engineering in any pre-established and differentiated human cell line, which, in contrast to mouse ES cells, have low rates of HR.

The technique has been widely adopted for use in engineering human cell lines to generate isogenic human disease models. It has also been used to optimize bioproducer cell lines for the biomanufacturing of protein vaccines and therapeutics. In addition, due to the non-pathogenic nature of rAAV, it has emerged as a desirable vector for performing gene therapy in live patients.

rAAV Vector

The rAAV genome is built of single-stranded deoxyribonucleic acid (ssDNA), either positive- or negative-sensed, which is about 4.7 kilobases long. These single-stranded DNA viral vectors have high transduction rates and have a unique property of stimulating endogenous HR without causing double strand DNA breaks in the genome, which is typical of other homing endonuclease mediated genome editing methods.

Capabilities

Users can design a rAAV vector to any target genomic locus and perform both gross and subtle endogenous gene alterations in mammalian somatic cell-types. These include gene knock-outs for functional genomics, or the ‘knock-in’ of protein tag insertions to track translocation events at physiological levels in live cells.  Most importantly, rAAV targets a single allele at a time and does not result in any off-target genomic alterations. Because of this, it is able to routinely and accurately model genetic diseases caused by subtle SNPs or point mutations that are increasingly the targets of novel drug discovery programs.

Applications

To date, the use of rAAV mediated genome engineering has been published in over 2100 peer reviewed scientific journals.  
Another emerging application of rAAV based genome editing is for gene therapy in patients, due to the accuracy and lack of off-target recombination events afforded by the approach.

See also 

 Biological engineering
 Genome engineering
 Homing endonuclease
 Homologous recombination
 Meganuclease
 Zinc finger nuclease
 Isogenic human disease models
 Cas9

References

Sources 

 Endogenous Expression of Oncogenic PI3K Mutation Leads to Activated PI3K Signaling and an Invasive Phenotype Poster Presented at AACR/EORTC Molecular Targets and Cancer Therapeutics, Boston, USA, Nov. 2009

 Endogenous Expression of Oncogenic PI3K Mutation Leads to accumulation of anti-apoptotic proteins in mitochondria Poster Presented at AACR 2010, Washington, D.C., USA, April. 2010
 The use of ‘X-MAN’ isogenic cell lines to define PI3-kinase inhibitor activity profiles Poster Presented at AACR 2010, Washington, D.C., USA, April. 2010
 The use of ‘X-MAN’ mutant PI3CA increases the expression of individual tubulin isoforms and promoted resistance to anti-mitotic chemotherapy drugs Poster Presented at AACR 2010, Washington, D.C., USA, April. 2010

Biochemistry
Recombinant proteins